Claudio Andrès Muñoz Camilo (born December 2, 1984) is a Chilean footballer who plays as a defender.

Club career
A product of Universidad Católica youth system, he is a well remembered player of Huachipato from 2012 to 2016. In 2008, he played abroad for the Venezuelan club Unión Atlético Maracaibo. 

In Chile, he also played for Provincial Osorno, Universidad de Concepción, Unión La Calera, Deportes Antofagasta and San Marcos de Arica, where he became the team captain. 

His last club was Tulsa Roughnecks in the 2018 USL.

International career
He made two appearances for the Chile national team in 2006 and 2007.

Post-retirement
Following his retirement, he made his home in Tulsa, Oklahoma and has continued with his studies as a soccer coach. He works as coach and director of West Side Alliance Soccer Club with men and women players.

Honours

Club
Universidad Católica
 Primera División de Chile (1): 2005 Clausura

Huachipato
 Primera División de Chile (1): 2012 Clausura

References

External links

1984 births
Living people
Footballers from Santiago
Chilean footballers
Chilean expatriate footballers
Chile international footballers
Club Deportivo Universidad Católica footballers
UA Maracaibo players
Provincial Osorno footballers
Universidad de Concepción footballers
Unión La Calera footballers
C.D. Huachipato footballers
C.D. Antofagasta footballers
San Marcos de Arica footballers
FC Tulsa players
Chilean Primera División players
Venezuelan Primera División players
Primera B de Chile players
USL Championship players
Chilean expatriate sportspeople in Venezuela
Chilean expatriate sportspeople in the United States
Expatriate footballers in Venezuela
Expatriate soccer players in the United States
Association football defenders
Chilean football managers
Chilean expatriate football managers
Expatriate soccer managers in the United States